Francis Zapa Koroma (born January 4, 1975 in Koidu Town, Sierra Leone) is a former Sierra Leonean footballer. He is the current manager of Old Edwardians who play in the Sierra Leone National Premier League

Career 
He played as a defender for the Leone Stars as well as the Diamond Stars in Sierra Leone and Allsvenskan in Sweden.

International 
Koroma was also a member of the Leone Stars' squad at the 1996 African Nations Cup in South Africa.

References

Living people
Sierra Leonean footballers
1996 African Cup of Nations players
1975 births
Association football defenders
People from Koidu
Sierra Leone international footballers